Hervé Lougoundji (born 27 April 1975) is a football manager from Central African Republic  who currently not contracted by a club or national team. From May 2012 to August 2014 he coached the Central African Republic national football team.

References

External links
Profile at Soccerway.com

Living people
Central African Republic football managers
Central African Republic national football team managers
1975 births